Studenok is a village in Izium Raion (district) in Kharkiv Oblast of eastern Ukraine, at about  south-east from the centre of Kharkiv city, on the left bank of the Siverskyi Donets river.

The settlement came under attack by Russian forces during the Russian invasion of Ukraine in 2022, and was liberated by the Ukrainian forces in September of the same year.

Demographics
The settlement had 1435 inhabitants in 2001, native language distribution as of the Ukrainian Census of 2001:
Ukrainian: 92.99%
Russian: 6.94%

References

Villages in Izium Raion